Evil Under the Sun is a work of detective fiction by British writer Agatha Christie, first published in the UK by the Collins Crime Club in June 1941 and in the US by Dodd, Mead and Company in October of the same year. The UK edition retailed at seven shillings and sixpence (7/6) and the US edition at $2.00.

The novel features Christie's detective, Hercule Poirot, who takes a holiday in Devon. During his stay, he notices a young woman who is flirtatious and attractive, but not well liked by a number of guests. When she is murdered during his stay, he finds himself drawn into investigating the circumstances surrounding the murder.

Plot summary
Hercule Poirot takes a quiet holiday at a secluded hotel in Devon. He finds that the other hotel guests include: Arlena Marshall, her husband Kenneth, and her step-daughter Linda; Horace Blatt; Major Barry, a retired officer; Rosamund Darnley, a former sweetheart of Kenneth; Patrick Redfern, and his wife Christine, a former teacher; Carrie Gardener, and her husband Odell; Reverend Stephen Lane; and Miss Emily Brewster, an athletic spinster. During the initial part of his stay, Poirot notes that Arlena is a flirtatious woman, who flirts with Patrick much to the fury of his wife, and that her step-daughter hates her. One morning, Arlena heads out for a secret rendezvous at Pixy Cove. By midday, she is found dead by Patrick and Brewster while they are rowing. An examination by the local police surgeon reveals she had been strangled by a man.

Both Poirot and the investigating officer, Inspector Colgate, interview the possible suspects about their movements during the morning – Kenneth had been typing letters; the Gardeners had been with Poirot all morning; Rosamund had been reading above Pixy Cove; Blatt had gone sailing; Linda and Christine went to Gull Cove and didn't return until before midday; and both Lane and Major Barry were absent from the island. At noon, Christine, Rosamund, Kenneth and Odell all met to play tennis. Poirot learns that Brewster was nearly hit by a bottle during the morning, thrown from one of the guest rooms, while the hotel chambermaid recalls hearing someone running a bath at noon. At a cave within Pixy Cove, Poirot notes smelling perfume that Arlena used there. Poirot later invites everyone to a picnic, which he uses to secretly observe their behaviour and test their vertigo. Following the picnic, Linda attempts suicide with Christine's sleeping pills. Poirot later discovers she felt guilt-ridden, after assuming she killed her step-mother through voodoo.

Via a request for similar cases to the current one, Poirot receives details on the strangulation of Alice Corrigan from Surrey police – her body was found by a local teacher, while her husband Edward had an alibi. Poirot is supplied with a photo of both people. Bringing together the suspects, Poirot denounces Patrick and Christine Redfern for Arlena's murder. She had been murdered to prevent her husband learning that she had been conned into investing a large inheritance towards "fabulous opportunities". The murder was well-planned to falsify the time of death. While Christine was with Linda, she set Linda's watch forward twenty minutes, asked for the time to set her alibi, then returned the watch to the correct time. Afterwards, Christine returned to her room and applied fake suntan makeup, which she concealed from sight, before tossing the bottle out the window. Sneaking out to Pixy Cove, Christine made certain Arlena saw her; Patrick had instructed Arlena to hide should his wife turn up before their rendezvous. Once Arlena was gone, Christine impersonated the dead body to fool Brewster, who immediately left to get help while Patrick remained behind. After Brewster's departure, Christine rushed back to the hotel to remove the makeup. Patrick then called out an unsuspecting Arlena and strangled her.

Poirot reveals that Christine lied about having a fear of heights, as she managed to traverse a suspended bridge during the picnic, and foolishly threw out the bottle of makeup from her room when Brewster was present outside. Linda's attempt at suicide was provoked by her. As further proof, Poirot reveals that the murder of Alice Corrigan happened in the same manner – the photo from Surrey Police identified Patrick as Edward Corrigan, who killed her, and Christine as the teacher who found the "body", before the murder had been committed. Poirot goads Patrick into a near-violent fury to expose himself, despite his wife trying to keep him quiet. With the case closed, Poirot tells Linda she did not kill Arlena and predicts she will not hate her next "step-mother", whereupon Kenneth and Rosamund rekindle their old love.

Characters
 Hercule Poirot, famous Belgian detective known for his magnificent moustache as well as his "little grey cells".
 Colonel Weston, Chief Constable.
 Inspector Colgate, investigating officer.
 Sergeant Phillips, policeman.
 Dr Neasden, police surgeon.
 Captain Kenneth Marshall, in his 40s, Arlena's husband, responsible, proud.
 Arlena Stuart Marshall, actress until a year earlier, Kenneth's wife for the last four years.
 Linda Marshall, Kenneth's 16-year-old daughter, Arlena's naive step daughter.
 Patrick Redfern, Christine's husband, seemingly infatuated with Arlena.
 Christine Redfern, Patrick's wife, tall and pretty "in a washed out way".
 Rosamund Darnley, fashionable dressmaker, Kenneth Marshall's long-ago sweetheart.
 Emily Brewster, athletic spinster, rows daily.
 Carrie Gardener, a garrulous American tourist.
 Odell Gardener, Carrie's patient American husband.
 Horace Blatt, large and too loud, avoided by everyone.
 Reverend Stephen Lane, who calls Arlena Marshall "evil through and through".
 Major Barry, retired officer, talks endlessly about India.
 Gladys Narracott, chambermaid in the Jolly Roger Hotel.
 Mrs Castle, owner of the Jolly Roger Hotel.

Literary significance and reception
The verdict by Maurice Willson Disher in The Times Literary Supplement of 14 June 1941 was positive: "To maintain a place at the head of detective-writers would be difficult enough without the ever increasing rivalry. Even Miss Christie cannot stay there unchallenged though she has a following which will swear her books are best without reading the others. Unbiased opinion may have given the verdict against her last season when new arrivals set a very hot pace; but Evil Under the Sun will take a lot of beating now." After summarising the plot, Disher concluded: "Miss Christie casts the shadow of guilt upon first one and then another with such casual ease that it is difficult for the reader not to be led by the nose. Everybody is well aware that any character most strongly indicated is not a likely criminal; yet this guiding principle is forgotten when Miss Christie persuades you that you are more discerning than you really are. Then she springs her secret like a land-mine."

In The New York Times Book Review of 19 October 1941, Isaac Anderson wrote, "The murder is an elaborately planned affair – a little too much so for credibility, in view of the many possibilities of a slip-up somewhere along the way – but Poirot's reasoning is flawless, as it always is. Evil Under the Sun adds another to the already long list of Agatha Christie's successful mystery tales."

Maurice Richardson in a short review in the 8 June 1941 issue of The Observer said, "Best Agatha Christie since Ten Little [Indians] – and one can't say much more than that – Evil Under the Sun has luxury summer hotel, closed-circle setting, Poirot in white trousers. Victim: redhead actress man-mad. Smashing solution, after clouds of dust thrown in your eyes, ought to catch you right out. Light as a soufflé."

The Scotsman of 3 July 1941 spoke of the "surprising discoveries" in the book's solution and said, "All of these the reader may best be left to encounter for himself in the assurance that the quest will prove as piquant as any this skilful writer has offered."

E.R. Punshon in The Guardian of 26 August 1941 briefly summed up the plot in a eulogistic piece which began, "Is it going too far to call Mrs. Agatha Christie one of the most remarkable writers of the day?"

Robert Barnard: "The classic Christie marital triangle plot set in West Country seaside resort, with particular play on the alikeness of sunbathing bodies, and dead ones. Possibly overingenious and slightly uncharacterised."

References to other works
The plot has some similarities to the Christie short story "Triangle at Rhodes", which was first published in the US in This Week magazine in February 1936 and in the UK in issue 545 of the Strand Magazine in May 1936, and included in the collection Murder in the Mews (US title: Dead Man's Mirror) one year later.

In "Triangle at Rhodes", Poirot again witnesses an apparent liaison between two married people. Again everyone believes that the responsible party is the beautiful Valentine Chantry, who is the murder victim. In "Triangle at Rhodes" the murder is by poison and it is thought that Chantry and her lover attempted to murder her husband and that the plot went wrong. Poirot, however, reveals that the murder was committed by Chantry's husband in cahoots with her apparent lover's wife, Mrs Gold, who intended to frame her hapless husband. In both stories, the key twist is that the appearance of the seductress' power deflects attention from the reality of the situation. In "Triangle at Rhodes", Mrs Gold says of Valentine Chantry "in spite of her money and her good looks and all [...] she's not the sort of woman men really stick to. She's the sort of woman, I think, that men would get tired of very easily." In Evil under the Sun, Poirot says of Arlena Marshall that she "[w]as the type of woman whom men care for easily and of whom they easily tire."

The character of Colonel Weston had originally appeared in Peril at End House and makes reference to that case upon his first appearance, in Chapter 5. Minor character Mrs Gardener is herself an admirer of Poirot's exploits and refers to the case of Death on the Nile in Chapter 1 of this novel.

The title refers to Ecclesiastes 6:1, which reads, "There is an evil that I have seen under the sun, and it lies heavy upon humankind." (New Revised Standard Version of the Bible) Ecclesiastes 6:2 continues, "those to whom God gives wealth, possessions, and honor, so that they lack nothing of all that they desire, yet God does not enable them to enjoy these things, but a stranger enjoys them.  This is vanity; it is a grievous ill."

Film, radio, TV or theatrical adaptations

Radio
John Moffatt starred as Poirot in a 1998 five-part BBC Radio 4 adaptation directed by Enyd Williams with a cast that included Iain Glen as Patrick Redfern, Fiona Fullerton as Arlena Marshall, Robin Ellis as Captain Marshall, Wendy Craig as Mrs Gardener, George Baker as Colonel Weston, and Joan Littlewood as Miss Brewster.

1982 film

The novel was adapted into a film in 1982, and was the second film to star Peter Ustinov as Poirot, after his debut in the same role in the 1978 film Death on the Nile. His co-stars included Maggie Smith, Diana Rigg, Denis Quilley, Roddy McDowall, James Mason, and Sylvia Miles. While the general plot of the murder remained the same, the film adaptation featured a number of changes to it:

 The setting was shifted to a secluded resort frequented by the rich and famous in the Adriatic Sea – this setting was filmed in Mallorca, Spain.
 Horace Blatt is a millionaire with a knighthood and not a heroin smuggler. Blatt was in a previous relationship with Arlena before she married Kenneth. He is investigated by Poirot for trying to insure a fake jewel, and reveals when interviewed that Arlena took the real jewel, but not before having it copied and giving the copy to Blatt. The real jewel later disappears during the murder, but is found in Patrick's possession by Poirot when he finds evidence to prove him as Arlena's murderer.
 Alice Corrigan's surname is changed to Ruber, and her murder occurs on the Yorkshire Moors. Poirot is involved in the investigation of her murder, through her insurance company that Blatt also uses, but while finding nothing, he retains the paperwork. This he later uses to help him prove Patrick's involvement in the murder, to reveal the handwriting on Alice's policy and cheque signed by him are the same. Poirot further adds that the surname of Ruber he used when he married Alice, is Latin for "Redfern"; Patrick's occupation in the past was a teacher in Latin.
 Christine Redfern's claim to have a fear of heights is exposed by Linda's account on the day of the murder. She had recalled Christine waving to her from the edge of a cliff. Poirot reveals this as part of his denouement. Christine also has Linda wear a swimming cap to muffle the sound of a cannon which fires at 12 o'clock, this plot element did not feature in the novel.
 Emily Brewster is changed to a man called Rex Brewster, the author of Arlena's yet-to-be-published tell-all biography.
 Linda Marshall does not attempt murder, is not suspected of the murder, and does not attempt suicide.
 The Gardeners are theatrical producers, who resent the fact that Arlena left a production of theirs on medical grounds; the pair question if this was done on purpose. Carrie is renamed Myra and is American instead. Myra replaces Brewster when going with Patrick on a boat to find Arlena's supposed dead body.
Major Barry, Inspector Colgate, and Reverend Stephen Lane are excluded from the story while Rosamund Darnley is renamed Daphne Castle acting as a former co-star of Arlena's and a hotel proprietor who has sympathy for Kenneth and Linda due to Arlena's treatment.

Television

Agatha Christie's Poirot
An adaptation of the novel was made for Agatha Christie's Poirot in 2001, starring David Suchet as Hercule Poirot. Filming for this episode mainly took place at the Burgh Island Hotel, Devon, a location which was inspiration for the original novel and And Then There Were None. Much of the plot remained the same as the novel, though the adaptation made a few changes:

 The characters of Carrie and Odell Gardener, Inspector Colgate and Dr Neasdon are omitted.
 The characters of Captain Hastings, Inspector Japp and Miss Lemon are included into the story. Hastings provides assistance in the case; Japp is the investigating officer; Miss Lemon makes inquiries into Alice Corrigan's murder at Poirot's request. Due to the addition of Chief Inspector Japp as the chief investigating officer of the murder, Weston is changed from the colonel to Chief Inspector, but only for the murder of Alice Corrigan, and he was also given the name "Charles".
 The hotel is a health retreat under a different name - Poirot is mainly there to recover from ill health, after collapsing during the opening night of Hastings' new Argentinian-themed restaurant, El Ranchero; when the case is completed, it is revealed his collapse was from food poisoning caused by the poor standards of hygiene at the restaurant. The establishment was a new investment from Captain Hastings.
 Linda Marshall is changed to a son called Lionel. He is found to be reading a book about poisoning, but doesn't attempt suicide in the course of the investigation.
 Christine does not make a claim that she has a fear of heights; this detail is omitted. She also applies the fake tan and throws out the bottle containing it, before she leaves to join Lionel.

French adaptation
The novel was adapted as a 2019 episode of the French television series Les Petits Meurtres d'Agatha Christie.

Video game adaptation

On 17 October 2007, The Adventure Company released a PC game adaptation of the book, which features actor Kevin Delaney as Hercule Poirot. This version includes the character of Captain Hastings as the player-character; as a game, Poirot re-creates the story, but allows Hastings to step into Poirot's shoes and solve the mystery as he would.

Publication history
 1941, Collins Crime Club (London), June 1941, Hardback, 256 pp
 1941, Dodd Mead and Company (New York), October 1941, Hardback, 260 pp
 1945, Pocket Books (New York), Paperback, 183 pp (Pocket number 285)
 1957, Fontana Books (Imprint of HarperCollins), Paperback, 189 pp
 1963, Pan Books, Paperback, 217 pp
 1971, Ulverscroft Large-print Edition, Hardcover, 362 pp
 2008, Poirot Facsimile Edition (Facsimile of 1941 UK First Edition), HarperCollins, 1 April 2008, Hardback; 
 2011, Hercule Poirot Mysteries series (Book 23), William Morrow Paperbacks, 30 August 2011, trade paper 

The book was first serialised in the US in Collier's Weekly in eleven parts from 14 December 1940 (Volume 106, Number 24) to 22 February 1941 (Volume 107, Number 8) with illustrations by Mario Cooper.

References in other media
 In The Martian, a novel by Andy Weir, protagonist Mark Watney spends Sol 482 reading Evil Under the Sun, incorrectly believing Linda Marshall is the murderer.

References

External links
Evil Under the Sun at the official Agatha Christie website
Evil Under the Sun at the Home of Agatha Christie website

Hercule Poirot novels
1941 British novels
Works originally published in Collier's
Novels first published in serial form
Novels set in Devon
Novels set in hotels
Collins Crime Club books
British novels adapted into films
British novels adapted into television shows